The House Across the Street is a 1949 American comedy/newspaper film directed by Richard L. Bare and written by Russell S. Hughes. The film stars Wayne Morris, Janis Paige, Bruce Bennett, Alan Hale, Sr., James Mitchell and Barbara Bates. The film was released by Warner Bros. on September 10, 1949. The story on which the screenplay was based, written by Roy Chanslor, was originally made as the movie Hi Nellie in 1936.  The source material had also been reworked in Love Is on the Air (1937) and You Can't Escape Forever (1942).

Plot
Newspaper managing editor Dave Joslin (Wayne  Morris) is demoted to the advice column of his newspaper due to his editorials criticizing the police for failing to safeguard a witness and investigate his murder.  With the help of his girlfriend Kit Williams (Janis Paige), the previous advice columnist, Joslin manages to secure the cooperation of Marty Bremer (James Mitchell) and the conviction of crime boss Matthew Keever (Bruce Bennett).  At the end, Joslin, reinstated as editor, offers Kit her old job back, but she accepts his marriage proposal instead.

Cast 
Wayne Morris as Dave Joslin
Janis Paige as Kit Williams
Bruce Bennett as Matthew J. Keever
Alan Hale, Sr. as J.B. Grennell
James Mitchell as Marty Bremer
Barbara Bates as Beth Roberts
James Holden as Carl Schrader

Reception
According to Warner Bros., the film earned $391,000 in the U.S. and $110,000 in other markets.

References

External links 
 

1949 films
Warner Bros. films
American comedy films
1949 comedy films
Films directed by Richard L. Bare
Films scored by William Lava
American black-and-white films
1940s English-language films
1940s American films